Dominic Frisby (born September 1969) is a British author, comedian and voice actor. He is best known as co-host of television programme Money Pit.

Early life
Dominic Frisby is the son of the playwright and novelist Terence Frisby, and Christine Doppelt. He was educated at St Paul's School, Manchester University and the Webber Douglas Academy of Dramatic Art, studying Italian and drama.

Career

Acting
Frisby is a voice actor, voicing film trailers and adverts since he left university. Frisby has performed at The Sitcom Trials, voiced series 5 and 6 of How Do They Do It?, provided many voices for Valhalla, narrated Extreme Universe, and voice-acted Moomins on the Riviera. In 2001, he was in the sitcom Sam's Game with Davina McCall, and he played Captain Rimming alongside Pam Ann in Mile High Club, part of Comedy Lab. In 2005, he played gay salsa teacher Jez in an episode of Murder in Suburbia. He narrated the documentary Four Horsemen, which he co-wrote, editing after the film was shot and writing the narration.

Comedy
He began performing live comedy in 1997, with the Upper Class Rapper. He began as a character comic, before also doing observational comedy and compering. In October 2001 he presented a radio show pilot at the Bracknell comedy festival. He appeared on the Edinburgh Festival Fringe in 2000, 2001, 2003 and 2016. Steve Bennett reviewing for Chortle in 2000 said his character comedy, including Upper Class Rapper and Ludwig the Bavarian, was a string of one-liners. The show had "inspired gags", but was "sadly patchy". Bennett's review three years later, calling his work "pleasant enough" but lacking an edge, noted he had moved on from being a character comic and decided to instead base his comedy on real life. In 2001, he took part in an attempt to get into the Guinness Book of Records at Edinburgh as one of 45 comics onstage in 45 minutes. He created the website Perrier Bets in 2004 to take bets on who would win the Perrier Award at Edinburgh.

He began compering in 2003, including at Downstairs at the King's Head in Crouch End, which he called his "favourite venue". He compered for Fulham F.C. in 2004, briefly replacing David Hamilton before Hamilton was reinstated.

In 2016, he returned to the Edinburgh Festival Fringe with his show "Let's Talk About Tax"; FringeReview called the show a "well-researched, engagingly delivered and thoroughly enlightening hour of education and entertainment". The Times said "it's not very funny. Rather, it's jaunty". The List found it "took stamina" to keep up with. Steve Bennett argued it is "better described as a lecture rather than a show" and it was "something of a stretch to pitch it as a comedy show".

He piloted a show for BBC Radio 4, More Money Than Sense, in May 2017.

In 2021, he became one of the presenters of GB News' comedy newspaper review programme Headliners, with Frisby co-presenting most of the nightly shows alongside BBC Radio 4 comedian Simon Evans.

Music
Dominic uploaded his first song, "Debt Bomb" To YouTube, as a satirical comedy regarding the economics of certain governments.
However, before that, he has posted the "Boris Johnson Rap".
After that he has posted "I'm secretly in love with Nigel Farage" In his album, "Libertarian Love Songs.", firstly played in comedy unleashed, the stand up Club.
After that, "Ode To The compost Bin." Also Called, "Ode to a Compost Heap", A song meant to show the value of self-interest and how it benefits all participants, with the example of a compost bin, 
"They tirelessly processes the peel and the rind.
With nothing but their self interest in mind,
Nothing is wasted, nor centrally planned,
It's like Adam smith's invisible hand"

Furthermore, Libertarian Love Songs Contained The Following Songs: 
1) National Anthem Of Libertaria;
2) Keyboard Warrior;
3) 17 Million Fuck Offs - A Song About Brexit;
4) Maybe;
5) Fuck The Government - The Ancap Calypso;
6) Secretly In Love (With Nigel Farage);
7) Hate Speech;
8) Passive Aggression;
9) The Gobbledygook Song;
10) Two Black Eyes;
11) Ode To The Compost Heap;
12) National Anthem Of Libertaria (Full Choir Version).

In February 2020, Frisby scored an Official Top 75 Chart hit, when "17 Million F*ck Offs - A Song About Brexit" charted at number 43 in the United Kingdom.

Economics
Frisby co-hosted Money Pit. He is a MoneyWeek contributor and writes for The Guardian. He appeared on Simon Evans Goes to Market on BBC Radio 4 to discuss gold. He is a non-executive director of cryptocurrency startup Coinworks.

Frisby has published three books. The first, Life After the State, berates the perceived failure of state to cater to people's views of it, and has been described variously as "a rollicking defence of anarcho-capitalism [and] a fantastic read" by The Idlers Tom Hodgkinson and "a deadly serious dismantling of the way societies are run in the west" by Virgin.com. His second, Bitcoin: The Future of Money, details the online currency Bitcoin and includes research on its creator Satoshi Nakamoto. Critical reception has been mixed: The Spectators Michael Bywater called it "a magnificent job", further commenting that "since reading Bitcoin I have been thinking about money ... with the same sort of intensity that atheists reserve for their relationship with God", however The Economist mused that "for any book on bitcoin to be worth reading, though, it has to delve further". His third book, Daylight Robbery: How Tax Shaped Our Past and Will Change Our Future, was selected by Merryn Somerset Webb as one of her six Christmas book choices for 2019.

Frisby has previously expressed his support for Brexit by writing and performing "17 Million Fuck Offs" and in 2019 was announced as the Brexit Party's parliamentary candidate in Old Bexley and Sidcup, however did not stand as the Brexit Party did not run candidates against Conservative MPs.

 Publications Life After The State, Unbound (2013). Bitcoin: The Future of Money, Unbound (2014). Daylight Robbery: How Tax Shaped Our Past and Will Change Our Future, Portfolio Penguin (2019). The Shadow punk Revolution : A Sci-Fi Rock Drama About Invisibility''

References

External links

1969 births
Living people
20th-century English comedians
20th-century English male actors
21st-century English comedians
21st-century English male actors
Alumni of the University of Manchester
Alumni of the Webber Douglas Academy of Dramatic Art
English financial writers
English male comedians
English male voice actors
English stand-up comedians
People educated at St Paul's School, London
People from Fulham
Place of birth missing (living people)